The Kuwaiti Progressive Movement is a political grouping in Kuwait. The group was established in 2011 as an extension of the Kuwaiti People's Union (founded in 1975). With the increasing visibility of socialism in the 1970s following the Vietnam War, the Ethiopian Civil War, the election of Salvador Allende in Chile, and the success of other national liberation movements such as the MPLA in Angola and the NLF in South Yemen (as well as others in the prior decade), leftists in Kuwait originally had to operate secretly due to restrictions put in place by the Emir until the end of the Gulf War.

References

Political parties in Kuwait
2011 establishments in Kuwait
Socialist parties in Asia
Arab socialist political parties